Arina Shulgina (Russian Арина Владимировна Шульгина, patronymic: Vladimirovna), born 25 June 1991, is a Russian professional triathlete. She is the winner of the sprint triathlon at the 2010 Russian Championships 2010 in Penza, and a reserve member of the Russian National Team.

Athletic career
At the Russian Championships 2010, Shulgina won the gold medals in the Junior/U23 category (юниорки) on the sprint distances. In 2010, Shulgina was number 3 in the Russian U23 (Юниорки) ranking, and number 5 in the U23 Russian Cup ranking.

In March 2011 Shulgina placed 7th at the Russian Elite Aquathlon Championships, in April 2011 she was awarded the title Master of Sport (Мастер спорта России).

Shulgina attends the Sports Elite School КОР No. 1 in Moscow. In France, Shulgina represents Issy Triathlon, in the 2011 D1 Duathlon Club Championship Series.

ITU results 

From 2007 to 2010, Shulgina took part in 8 ITU competitions, from 2009 on she has also taken part in elite events. Unless indicated otherwise, the following events are triathlons (Olympic Distance) and refer to the Elite category.

DNF = Did not finish
DNS = Did not start

Gallery

References

External links

 Russian Triathlon Federation 

1991 births
Living people
Russian female triathletes